The Polish manual alphabet is a single-handed manual alphabet used in Polish Sign Language. 

Languages of Poland
Manual alphabet